Subodh Roy (1915 – 26 August 2006) (also known as Jhunku Roy) was an Indian revolutionary socialist who was influential in the Indian independence movement, and a politician.

Biography 
Subodh Roy was born in 1915 in a rich family at Chittagong in erstwhile-undivided Bengal. At the age of 14, he was the youngest participant in the Chittagong armoury raid in 1930-31 under the direction of the revolutionary leader Surya Sen (Masterda). Roy was in the first batch to be sentenced.

After the trial, Subodh Roy was deported to the Cellular Jail in Port Blair in 1934.

After the release from jail in 1940, he joined communist politics and became a member of the Communist Party of India. After the independence, he shifted to Calcutta and joined as a wholetimer at the Provincial Centre of the Party. After the split in Communist Party of India in 1964, Subodh Roy sided with the Communist Party of India (Marxist) (CPI(M)). And he was a longstanding member of the West Bengal state committee of the CPI(M).

Subodh Roy made a major scholarly contribution to the history of the communist movement. After research in the National Archives, he edited a book "Communism in India: Unpublished Documents".

Popular culture
Delzad Hilwade played the role of young Subodh Roy(Jhunku) while Vijay Varma played his older self in Bedabrata Pain's film Chittagong.

References 

Revolutionary movement for Indian independence
Indian revolutionaries
Anti-British establishment revolutionaries from East Bengal
People from Chittagong District
Communist Party of India (Marxist) politicians from West Bengal
1915 births
2006 deaths